Federica Sala (born 18 July 1993) is an Italian synchronised swimmer.

She won a bronze medal in the team free routine competition at the 2018 European Aquatics Championships.

References

1993 births
Living people
Italian synchronized swimmers
World Aquatics Championships medalists in synchronised swimming
Artistic swimmers at the 2019 World Aquatics Championships
Artistic swimmers at the 2022 World Aquatics Championships
European Aquatics Championships medalists in synchronised swimming
People from Vimercate
Sportspeople from the Province of Monza e Brianza